Selenocheir is a genus of flat-backed millipedes in the family Xystodesmidae. There are at least three described species in Selenocheir.

Species
These three species belong to the genus Selenocheir:
 Selenocheir arcuata Shelley, 1994
 Selenocheir directa Shelley, 1994
 Selenocheir sinuata Shelley, 1994

References

Further reading

 
 

Polydesmida
Articles created by Qbugbot